Paweł Zieliński (born 17 July 1990) is a Polish professional footballer who plays as a right-back for Widzew Łódź.

Career
After four seasons at Miedź Legnica, Zieliński moved to Widzew Łódź on 30 June 2021, signing a two-year deal.

Personal life
He is the older brother of Napoli midfielder Piotr Zieliński.

External links

References

1990 births
Living people
Association football defenders
Polish footballers
Ekstraklasa players
I liga players
Zagłębie Lubin players
Śląsk Wrocław players
Widzew Łódź players
People from Ząbkowice Śląskie
Sportspeople from Lower Silesian Voivodeship
Miedź Legnica players